Deadicated: A Tribute to the Grateful Dead is a 1991 tribute album with music of the Grateful Dead performed by various artists.

According to the liner notes, the compilation is a rainforest benefit album, with significant proceeds from its sale being donated to the Rainforest Action Network and Cultural Survival.

The Harshed Mellows, the band that performs the song "U.S. Blues", was a one-off group formed exclusively for this album, featuring Dan Baird and drummer Mauro Magellen of the Georgia Satellites, Mike Campbell, Benmont Tench, and Stan Lynch of Tom Petty and the Heartbreakers, producer Brendan O'Brien, and folk singer Michelle Malone.  The term "Harshed Mellows" comes from the phrase "harsh my mellow", which means to be a killjoy, delivering bad news to someone who is happy/content/high.

Track listing

Personnel

By song
"Bertha" (produced by Los Lobos)
David Hidalgo – lead vocals, acoustic guitar, accordion, bass
Cesar Rosas – electric guitar
Conrad Lozano – bass, vocals
Steve Berlin – organ, percussion
Louis Perez – drums
Victor Bisetti – percussion

"Jack Straw" (produced by Bruce Hornsby and the Range and Eddie King)
Bruce Hornsby – piano, synthesizers, vocals
George Marinelli Jr. – guitar, background vocals
John Molo – drums
John Puerta – bass, background vocals
John J. T. Thomas – keyboards

"U. S. Blues" (produced by Ralph Sall)
Dan Baird – throat, guitar
Michelle Malone – throat
Stan Lynch – gang drum, primitive ritual percussion
Mauro Magellan – gang drum
Mike Campbell – guitar
Benmont Tench – piano, organ
Brendan O'Brien – bass

"Ship Of Fools" (produced by D.P.A. McManus and Kevin Killen)
Elvis Costello – guitar, vocals
Jim Keltner – drums
Jerry Scheff – bass
Larry Knechtel – piano
James Burton – guitar
Marc Ribot – banjo, horn

"China Doll" and "Cassidy" (produced by Ralph Sall)
Suzanne Vega – vocals
Anton Sanko – pump organ, Akai S-1000
Marc Shulman – acoustic guitar, tiple, electric guitar
Michael Visceglia – acoustic bass guitar
Frank Vilardi – bodhrán, cymbals, drums, bongos
Jeff Scantlebury – percussion

"Truckin'" (produced by Pete Anderson)
Dwight Yoakam – lead vocals
Tommy Funderburk – background vocals
Pete Anderson – lead guitar
Jeff Donavan – drums
Skip Edwards – keyboards
Taras Prodaniuk – bass

"Uncle John's Band" (produced by Ralph Sall)
Amy Ray – guitar, vocals
Emily Saliers – guitar, vocals
Randell Kirsch – vocals
LuAnn Kirsch – vocals
Chris Hickey – vocals
Dan McNamara – congas, percussion
Barbara Marino – percussion

"Casey Jones" (produced by Ralph Sall)
Warren Zevon – piano, vocals
David Lindley – guitars, vocals
Jorge Calderón – bass, vocals
Stan Lynch – drums, percussion
Ian Mclagan – Hammond B-3 organ

"Friend of the Devil" (produced by George Massenburg, Lyle Lovett, and Billy Williams)
Lyle Lovett – guitar, vocals
Russell Kunkel – drums
Leland Sklar – bass
Dean Parks – guitars
Bill Payne – piano

"To Lay Me Down" (produced by Michael Timmins)
Margo Timmins – vocals
Michael Timmins – guitar
Peter Timmins – drums
Alan Anton – bass
Jeff Bird – harmonica, mandolin
Kim Deschamps – dobro, pedal steel guitar
Jaro Czerwinec – accordion

"Wharf Rat" (produced by Ralph Sall and Midnight Oil)
Peter Garrett – harmonica, vocals
Rob Hirst – drums, vocals
Bones Hillman – bass, vocals
Martin Rotsey – guitar
Jim Moginie – guitar, keyboards, vocals

"Estimated Prophet" (produced by Ralph Sall)
Winston Rodney – vocals
Nelson Miller – drums
Linval Jarett – piano, guitar
Paul Beckford – bass
Alvin Hawton – percussion
Dave Robinson – saxophone
James K. Smith – trumpet
Charles Dickey – trombone
Jay Noel – keyboards

"Deal" (produced by Ralph Sall)
Dr. John – piano, vocals
Freddy Staehle – drums
Rafael Cruz – percussion
Wilbur Bascomb – bass
Joe Caro – guitar
Lew Soloff – trumpet
Andrew Snitzer – tenor saxophone
Ronnie Cuber – baritone saxophone

"Ripple" (produced by Ralph Sall and Perry Farrell)
Perry Farrell – vocals
Dave Navarro – guitars
Stephen Perkins – drums, percussion
Eric Avery – bass

Album production
Executive producer, concept – Ralph Sall
A&R – Roy Lott
Booklet design – Ann Petter
Illustration – MIKIO, William Giese
Tree bark photo – W. Cody, Westlight
Engineers – Dusty Wakeman, Eddie King, Peter Doell, Leslie Jones, Ray Blair, Kevin Killen, Steve Lyon, Nick Addison, Clif Norrell, George Massenburg, Bob Doidge, Thom Cadley, Lee Anthony, Michel Sauvage, Junior Edwards, S. Morris, C. Gopie, Michael Scalcione, Tim Leitner, Patrick Dillette, Joe Gibb
Mixing – Ralph Sall, Ray Blair, Steve Addabbo, Anton Sanko, David Leonard, Brian Foxworthy, Noel Hazen, George Massenburg, Cowboy Junkies, Bob Doidge, Michel Sauvage

References 

1991 compilation albums
Grateful Dead tribute albums
Arista Records compilation albums
Country rock compilation albums
Folk rock compilation albums